Kristina Ann Kowal (born October 9, 1978) is an American former competition swimmer, Olympic medalist, and former world record-holder.  Kowal represented the United States at the 2000 Summer Olympics in Sydney, winning the silver medal in the 200-meter breaststroke. She was the first American woman to win a world championship title in the 100-meter breaststroke.

Kowal helped her college team, the Georgia Bulldogs swimming and diving team of the University of Georgia (UGA), win two NCAA Division I Women's Swimming and Diving Championships.  She was the NCAA swimmer of the year in 1999 and 2000.  Kowal was the first American woman to break the one-minute barrier in the 100-yard breaststroke. She won eight NCAA titles and 10 U.S. Swimming national titles. During her college career she held 8 American and one world record.  In 2000, she was named NCAA Woman of the Year and she was recipient of the Today's Top VIII Award as a member of the Class of 2001, which honors eight senior student-athletes each year. She graduated from UGA in 2002 with a Bachelor of Science in Education (B.S.Ed).

Kowal became a member of the United States Swimming Team in 1995 at the age of 16. Kowal was an also alternate on the 1996 Olympic team in the 100 meter breaststroke, the 2000 Olympic team in the 100 meter breaststroke, and the 2004 Olympic team in the 200 meter breaststroke. She is now an Elementary School Teacher.

She was inducted into the Pennsylvania Swimming Hall of Fame in 2009, the National Polish-American Sports Hall of Fame in 2010, University of Georgia's Circle of Honor in 2012 and the Georgia Aquatic Hall of Fame in 2013.

See also
 List of Olympic medalists in swimming (women)
 List of University of Georgia people
 List of World Aquatics Championships medalists in swimming (women)
 World record progression 4 × 100 metres medley relay

References

External links

 Official webpage
 
 
 
National Polish-American Sports HOF profile

1978 births
Living people
American female breaststroke swimmers
American people of Polish descent
World record setters in swimming
Georgia Bulldogs women's swimmers
Olympic silver medalists for the United States in swimming
Sportspeople from Reading, Pennsylvania
Swimmers at the 2000 Summer Olympics
World Aquatics Championships medalists in swimming
Medalists at the 2000 Summer Olympics